16 Biggest Hits is a 1998 Merle Haggard compilation album. It is part of a series of similar 16 Biggest Hits albums released by Legacy Recordings.

All songs except "Big City", "Are the Good Times Really Over (I Wish a Buck Was Still Silver)" and "Going Where the Lonely Go" are re-recordings from October 1994.

The album was certified Gold in 2002 by the RIAA. It has sold 955,000 copies in the US as of May 2013.

Track listing
"Swinging Doors" (Merle Haggard) – 2:50
"The Bottle Let Me Down" (Haggard) – 2:42
"I'm a Lonesome Fugitive" (Casey Anderson, Liz Anderson) – 3:09
"Branded Man" (Haggard) – 3:09
"Sing Me Back Home" (Haggard) – 2:50
"Mama Tried" (Haggard) – 2:10
"Hungry Eyes" (Haggard) – 3:37
"Workin' Man Blues" (Haggard) – 2:41
"Okie from Muskogee" (Roy Edward Burris, Haggard) – 2:41
"The Fightin' Side of Me" (Haggard) – 2:52
"Daddy Frank (The Guitar Man)" (Haggard) – 3:39
"I Think I'll Just Stay Here and Drink" (Haggard) – 3:40
"Big City" (Haggard, Dean Holloway) – 3:00
"Are the Good Times Really Over (I Wish a Buck Was Still Silver)" (Haggard) – 4:14
"Going Where the Lonely Go" (Haggard, Holloway) – 4:50
"Silver Wings" (Haggard) – 2:47

Personnel
 Merle Haggard – vocals, guitar

The Strangers:
 Roy Nichols – lead guitar
 Norman Hamlet – steel guitar
 Tiny Moore – mandolin, fiddle
 Eldon Shamblin– guitar
 Ralph Mooney – steel guitar
 Gene Price – bass
 Gordon Terry - fiddle
 Ronnie Reno – guitar
 Bobby Wayne – guitar
 Marcia Nichols – guitar
 Clint Strong – guitar
 Mark Yeary – piano
 George French – piano
 Dennis Hromek – bass
 James Tittle – bass
 Johnny Meeks - bass
 Jerry Ward – bass
 Wayne Durham – bass
 Biff Adam – drums
 Eddie Burris – drums
 Don Markham – saxophone
 Jimmy Belkin – fiddle
 Gary Church – horns

Chart performance
16 Biggest Hits peaked at number 55 on the U.S. Billboard Top Country Albums chart in 1999.

Certifications

References

Haggard, Merle
Merle Haggard compilation albums
1998 greatest hits albums